Combiers is a commune in the Charente department in southwestern France.

Geography
The Lizonne (locally called Nizonne) forms most of the commune's southern border.

Population

Sights
 Arboretum Jean Aubouin
The grandmontine priory of Rauzet

See also
Communes of the Charente department

References

Communes of Charente